Sound of Tears is a 2014 Canadian movie directed and written by the Cameroonian director Dorothy A. Atabong.

Plot 
Amina and her family have left the city running away from her estranged lover, Josh, but he manages to track them down.

Awards
Sound of Tears won the award for Best Diaspora Short film at the 11th Africa Movie Academy Awards in 2015. The film was selected by the Ecrans Noirs Festival in 2016, and won awards at the 2018 International Images Film Festival for Women (IIFF).

Cast 
 Dorothy Atabong 
 Edsson Morales 
 Eugene Paul 
 Rhoma Spencer 
 Edgar Fraser 
 Albert Williams 
 Aisha Betham

References

External links
 Sound of Tears website
 

Canadian drama films
Cameroonian drama films
2014 films
English-language Canadian films
English-language Cameroonian films
Black Canadian films
2010s Canadian films